Casamicciola Terme is a comune (municipality) in the Metropolitan City of Naples in the Italian region Campania, located in the northern part of the Ischia Island.

Geography
Casamicciola Terme borders the following municipalities: Barano d'Ischia, Forio, Ischia, Lacco Ameno, Serrara Fontana.

History

In 1883, an earthquake struck the northern part of Ischia. Despite the moderate magnitude of 4.2–5.5, many buildings in the across the island were totally destroyed. The city was heavily damaged—many homes and businesses were demolished. At least 2,313 people were killed—1,784 people died in the city alone.

On August 21, 2017 was hit by a 4.3 magnitude earthquake, killing two people wounding 42 more, and causing damage to some houses. On November 26, 2022 strong rainfall led to a landslide killing of 12 lives and left over 200 people homeless. The severe landslide caused the destruction or damage of numerous buildings in Casamicciola.

Main sights
Church of Sant'Antonio al Mortito

Notable people
The Swiss-born physician Jacques Etienne Chevalley de Rivaz who had a famous sanatorium in Casamicciola and lived there from 1830 until his death in 1863. He was made an honorary citizen of Casamicciola in 1837 for his work in halting a cholera outbreak in nearby Forio.

References

External links

 Official website

Cities and towns in Campania
Ischia